Marek Penksa (born 4 August 1973 in Veľký Krtíš) is a Slovak footballer (midfielder), who last played for ASK Marienthal. He is a very experienced player, and has played for the Slovak national team.

Honours
 UEFA Under-16 Championship (1): 1990
 Hungarian Cup (2): 2003, 2004
 Hungarian League (1): 2004

References

External links
 
 

1973 births
Living people
People from Veľký Krtíš
Sportspeople from the Banská Bystrica Region
Slovak footballers
Czechoslovak footballers
Czechoslovakia under-21 international footballers
Slovakia international footballers
Slovak expatriate footballers
FK Dukla Banská Bystrica players
1. FC Tatran Prešov players
Slovak Super Liga players
Wisła Kraków players
Eintracht Frankfurt players
Dynamo Dresden players
Grazer AK players
SK Rapid Wien players
DSV Leoben players
Stuttgarter Kickers players
Expatriate footballers in Hungary
Ferencvárosi TC footballers
Slovak expatriate sportspeople in Hungary
Expatriate footballers in Germany
Expatriate footballers in Poland
Bundesliga players
2. Bundesliga players
Slovak expatriate sportspeople in Germany
Slovak expatriate sportspeople in Poland
Slovak expatriate sportspeople in Austria
Nemzeti Bajnokság I players
Austrian Football Bundesliga players
Association football midfielders